The 2014 PBZ Zagreb Indoors was an ATP tennis tournament played on hard courts indoors. It was the 9th edition of the PBZ Zagreb Indoors, and part of the ATP World Tour 250 series of the 2014 ATP World Tour. It took place in Zagreb, Croatia from February 3 through February 9, 2014.

Singles main-draw entrants

Seeds 

 Rankings are as of January 27, 2014.

Other entrants 
The following players received wildcards into the singles main draw:
  Borna Ćorić
  Mate Delić
  Ante Pavić

The following players received entry from the qualifying draw:
  Michael Berrer
  Peđa Krstin
  Andrey Kuznetsov
  Björn Phau

The following player received entry as a lucky loser:
  Daniel Evans

Withdrawals 
Before the tournament
  Grigor Dimitrov 
  Feliciano López
  Florian Mayer
  Jürgen Melzer (shoulder injury)
  Milos Raonic (leg injury)
  Radek Štěpánek (heel injury)
  Janko Tipsarević (achillar tendon injury)

Doubles main-draw entrants

Seeds 

 Rankings are as of January 27, 2014.

Other entrants 
The following pairs received wildcards into the doubles main draw:
  Toni Androić /  Marin Čilić
  Dino Marcan /  Nikola Mektić

Withdrawals 
During the tournament
  Mikhail Youzhny (illness)

Champions

Singles 

 Marin Čilić def.  Tommy Haas, 6–3, 6–4

Doubles 

 Jean-Julien Rojer /  Horia Tecău def.  Philipp Marx /  Michal Mertiňák, 3–6, 6–4, [10–2]

References

External links 
 

Zagreb Indoors
PBZ Zagreb Indoors
2014 in Croatian tennis